The Ministry of Interior (Vâzart-e Kâshvar) of the Islamic Republic of Iran is in charge of performing, supervising and reporting elections, policing, and other responsibilities related to an interior ministry.

Duties
To provide and protect domestic security and establishment of peace and order across the country and coordination between intelligence, disciplinary, and military organs and protecting borders
To manage police affairs
To make an effort to achieve and develop political and social freedoms according to the constitution and other laws of the country and providing sustainable political and social development and promotion of public participation
To protect and preserve the achievements of I.R. of Iran through public participations
To provide conditions of appropriate practice of political and nongovernmental parties and formations and supervision on their activities
To guide, lead and support of Islamic councils and supervision on their activities
To establish desirable discipline in national divisions
To coordinate and lead province governor generals to fulfill general policies and governmental plans
To make policy, lead and supervise on affairs related to foreign nationals and emigrants
To implement general policies of the government in order to make progress in social , economical and developmental plans
To plan for elections affairs
To coordinate for development of rural and urban development affairs and technical- executive guidance and support of municipalities and rural districts managers and supervision on execution of rules and regulations thereto
To plan and manage to overcome crises resulted from natural disasters and unforeseen accidents
To identify Iranian identities
To supervise and manage affairs of regions across the country by governor generals, governors, governors of districts and rural district managers

Ministers of Interior since 1979

See also

Ministry of Intelligence (Iran)
Ministry of Justice (Iran)

References

External links

1901 establishments in Iran
Interior
Ministries established in 1901
Iran